Charles T. Jordan may refer to:

 Charles Jordan (magician) (1888–1944), American magician
 Charlie Jordan (baseball) (1871–1928), Major League Baseball pitcher